Kandila is a village and a community in the municipal unit of Levidi, Arcadia, Greece. It is situated on the southern slope of the Oligyrtos mountain, at about 800 m elevation. In 2011, it had a population of 690 for the village and 714 for the community, which includes the village Diakopi. Kandila is near the tripoint of Arcadia, Corinthia and Argolis. It is 5 km southwest of Skoteini (Argolis), 12 km northeast of Levidi and 29 km north of Tripoli. The Greek National Road 66 (Levidi – Nemea) passes through the village.

The village is not visible from far away, with the exception of the Monastery of Virgin Mary, which is built inside a large rock, on the side of the mountain and can be seen as you enter the plateau.

Population

History

In a document from 1467, it was stated that the Fields of Kandila, (the Kandyliotikos Kampos) were farmed and had ample supply of water.

In 1777, following the Orlov events, many inhabitants of Kandila bearing the name "Sakkakos" migrated to Koldere, near Magnesia (ad Sipylum).

In 1997, Kandila and all the surrounding communities were combined under the Kapodistrias law into one jurisdiction, to form the Municipality of Levidi.

See also
 List of settlements in Arcadia
 Depression (geology)
 Karst

References

External links
Kandila at the GTP Travel Pages
''This article is mostly based on levidionline.com

Populated places in Arcadia, Peloponnese